Mu Chun is a fictional character in Water Margin, one of the Four Great Classical Novels in Chinese literature. Nicknamed "Little Unrestrained", he ranks 80th among the 108 Stars of Destiny and 44th among the 72 Earthly Fiends.

Background
Mu Chun is nicknamed “Little Unrestrained" as his elder brother Mu Hong is called "The Unrestrained".  The Mus, who are wealthy and skilled in martial arts, have huge influence and are feared in Jieyang Town (揭陽鎮; believed to be in present-day Jiujiang, Jiangxi) near the Xunyang River, where they live.

Meeting Song Jiang
When Song Jiang is in on the way to exile in Jiangzhou (江州; present-day Jiujiang, Jiangxi), a reduced sentence for killing his mistress Yan Poxi, he passes by Jieyang Town with his two escorts. He comes upon Xue Yong, who is performing martial stunts on the roadside for tips from onlookers. When Xue first came to Jieyang, he did not go to pay respects to the Mu brothers, who are feared by the local people. To punish him for the snub, the brothers have ordered the townspeople not to patronise him. Unaware of that order, Song Jiang generously tips Xue impressed by his performance and out of pity that no one awards him. Angry that Song made his family lose face, Mu Chun, who is among the onlookers, rushes forth wanting to beat him up. However, he is floored by Xue Yong.

Humiliated, Mu Chun orders every inn and house in the town not to accommodate Song Jiang and his two escorts for the night. The one person who offers them free lodgings is Mus' father, who is kindly and unaware of what have happened. While at the Mus' manor, Song Jiang overhears Mu Chun looking for his brother Mu Hong to help in tracking him down. He also learns that Xue Yong is captured and has been beaten up.

Song Jiang and the two escorts sneak away under the cover of night from the manor. But the brothers have learnt about their presence at their house and come after them. In desperation the three board the boat of the pirate boatman Zhang Heng. Midway across the Xunyang River, Zhang wants to kill and rob them. Fortunately, Li Jun, whom Song Jiang has recently befriended at Jieyang Ridge, passes by and saves Song in the nick of time. Zhang is shocked to learn that the exile is Song Jiang, who is famous for his chivalry. The Mu brothers, who have been waiting at the bank, are also surprised when told of his identity. The group treat Song as an honoured guest until he leaves for Jiangzhou.

Joining Liangshan
In Jiangzhou Song Jiang is arrested and sentenced to death for writing a seditious poem on a wall in a restaurant. The outlaws from Liangshan Marsh rush to Jiangzhou, where they save him just when he is going to be executed. But they are stranded at a river bank. In the meantime, friends that Song Jiang has made in the Jieyang region, led by Li Jun and including Mu Chun, are sailing to Jiangzhou to rescue Song. They come upon the group and ferry them to safety. Together they head for Liangshan, where Mu Chun becomes one of the chieftains.

Campaigns
Mu Chun is appointed as one of the leaders of the Liangshan infantry after the 108 Stars of Destiny came together in what is called the Grand Assembly, . He participates in the campaigns against the Liao invaders and rebel forces in Song territory following amnesty from Emperor Huizong for Liangshan.

After the Liangshan force conquer Hangzhou in the campaign against Fang La, six heroes fall sick and Mu Chun is told to stay at the city to look after them. Soon after the campaign ends in victory, Mu Chun loses his brother Mu Hong, who dies from illness in Runzhou (潤州; present-day Runzhou District, Zhenjiang, Jiangsu),  

When the survivors of Liangshan are back in the imperial capital Dongjing, Mu Chun is conferred the title "Martial Gentleman of Grace". But he declines official appointment and returns home to lead the life of a commoner.

References
 
 
 
 
 
 
 

72 Earthly Fiends
Fictional characters from Jiangxi